Tony Romano (born January 5, 1988) is an American former professional ice hockey player from Smithtown, New York. He is last played for Stavanger Oilers of the Norwegian GET-ligaen.

Playing career
Romano was drafted by the New Jersey Devils in the sixth round (178th overall pick) of the 2006 NHL Entry Draft. Prior to the draft, Romano graduated from St. Anthony's High School on Long Island, and played for the New York Bobcats of the Atlantic Junior Hockey League, scoring 50 goals in the 2005–06 season. After being drafted, he spent the following year playing for Cornell University, where he led the team's rookies with a total of nine goals and ten assists.

Romano then went on to play for the London Knights of the Ontario Hockey League during the 2007–08 season, citing the switch in leagues due to his limited number of games played in Cornell. Romano didn't play well during this season, partially due to off-season shoulder surgery. Romano played for the Peterborough Petes in the following season, where he scored 36 goals in 65 games. He was the team's leading scorer for the season.

On June 30, 2009, Romano was traded from the New Jersey Devils to the New York Islanders in exchange for Ben Walter and a conditional 2012 draft pick. After being traded, Romano attended the Islanders' "mini-camp," where many of the younger Islanders players began training together. Regarding joining the Islanders, Romano said, "I’ve put in a lot of time through the years. I’ve worked hard all my life, and to possibly be one phone call away from playing with them is a great feeling. I’m a hometown kid and this is the team I grew up idolizing. Pierre Turgeon was my favorite player, and I remember going to the game when they retired Bryan Trottier’s number. It’s just real comforting to be here and be close to home."

After beginning the 2009–10 season with the Bridgeport Sound Tigers of the American Hockey League, he was assigned to the Utah Grizzlies of the ECHL on December 8, 2009.

After three seasons with Sound Tigers, Romano signed a one-year deal with Austrian EBEL side Vienna Capitals. After one season in the EBEL, Romano played two years in the Swedish second-tier HockeyAllsvenskan with Västerås and Malmö Redhawks. After one year playing in Norway, Romano signed a one-year contract with the Odense Bulldogs of the Danish Metal Ligaen in July 2016.

Career statistics

References

External links

Living people
1988 births
American men's ice hockey centers
Bridgeport Sound Tigers players
Chicago Express players
Cornell Big Red men's ice hockey players
Ice hockey players from New York (state)
London Knights players
Lørenskog IK players
Malmö Redhawks players
New Jersey Devils draft picks
Odense Bulldogs players
Sportspeople from Smithtown, New York
Peterborough Petes (ice hockey) players
Stavanger Oilers players
Toledo Walleye players
Utah Grizzlies (ECHL) players
Vienna Capitals players
VIK Västerås HK players